Lionel Robert 'Lyle' Morgan (15 July 1887 – 11 November 1968) was an Australian rules footballer who played with Melbourne in the Victorian Football League (VFL).

Notes

External links 

1887 births
1968 deaths
Australian rules footballers from Victoria (Australia)
Melbourne Football Club players